NGC 3114 is a sparse open cluster which is projected onto the outskirts of the Carina complex.

Because of the high number of field stars from the disc of the Milky Way, it is very difficult object to study as this contamination makes its size ambiguous.

Studies of NGC 3114
NGC 3114 has first been subject of studies in 1963, when Jankowitz and McCosh obtained photographic UBV photometry  for 171 of its stars and photoelectric UBV photometry of 52 stars.

In 1988, Schneider and Weiss obtained photometry data for 122 stars, revising the cluster reddening to be .

Three years later, Sagar and Sharpless made the largest data recording of the cluster to date, obtaining BV CCD photometry of around 350 stars from seven 3.6'×5.4' regions.  Because these regions were rather far from the cluster centre, a substantial contamination was expected.  Nevertheless, by assuming the cluster reddening value obtained by Schneider and Weiss, they found the cluster to be  pc, which agreed with the measurements taken 28 years previously by Jankowitz and McCosh.  They also found the age of the cluster to be  years.

Gallery

See also
 List of open clusters
 Open cluster family
 Open cluster remnant
 Star clusters
 Stellar associations

References

External links
 

Open clusters
18260308
Carina (constellation)
3114